Abbots Bromley School (previously the School of S. Mary and S. Anne, Abbots Bromley before becoming Abbots Bromley School for Girls) was a coeducational boarding and day private school in the village of Abbots Bromley, Staffordshire, England. It was one of the original Woodard Schools — and the first such for girls — and so was an Anglican foundation that historically reflected the Anglo-Catholic ethos of the Woodard Foundation. It was affiliated to the Girls' Schools Association, but financial problems over many years closed it in the summer of 2019.

History

The School of S. Anne
With the foundation of the School of S. Anne, Nathaniel Woodard's project to provide education for the middle classes was extended to girls. Woodard had been reluctant to start a school for girls, but some of his closest friends strongly disagreed. Edward Clarke Lowe, in particular, believed that university education should be open to women. These friends eventually prevailed upon Woodard and secured his blessing and his enormous fund-raising skills to found the School of S. Anne in 1874. Even after its opening, Woodard continued to express the view that his foundation might be wasting its efforts in promoting the education of women.

The school was established at Abbots Bromley partly because it was near Denstone College, another Woodard school which had been founded a few years before. Its location in the Anglican diocese of Lichfield also helped to secure for it the goodwill of Bishop Selwyn.

Alice Mary Coleridge, Lowe's sister-in-law and adopted child, played a central role in the evolving vision that led to the foundation of the school. Alice Coleridge, who had been greatly influenced by Anna Sewell and her godmother, Charlotte Mary Yonge, became Lady Warden of S. Anne's in 1878 and instituted a spartan regime and a broadly based curriculum.

Marcia Rice, a Scottish episcopalian with natural authority, became the head in 1900 when there were 54 pupils. The school gained four houses and it expanded to over 100 by 1913 and the school bought nearby property to allow for the required expansion of an infirmary, chapel cloisters and more accommodation. In 1905 the school gained a debating Society "St Anne's Political and Social Problems Club" and in 1910 the first school prefects were appointed as some authority was delegated from the staff to the pupils.

During World War One the school had a cadet force, but at the end of the war the group was converted into a Girl Guides troupe.

The school was not selective in terms of an entrance exam but it did have high fees. The school had therefore to look after not only its academic pupils striving for university entry but the curriculum also included technical, practical subjects and games. As the school merged the head of this school had to tactfully manage the merger with girls from more modest homes.

The School of S. Mary
Given the missionary ethos of the school's foundation, Alice Coleridge also tried to make some educational provision for girls from families who were unable to afford the fees required by the School of S. Anne. As a result, the School of S. Mary was founded in Abbots Bromley in 1880 to educate more cheaply 'the daughters of clergymen and other professional men of limited means and of the agricultural and commercial classes generally'. The School of S. Mary was built on a site immediately opposite the School of S. Anne.

S. Mary's did not prove to be viable, so the schools were amalgamated in 1921 under headteacher Marcia Rice. She retired in 1931 when there were 300 pupils.

S. Mary's was later reopened for the Upper Six Boarders of Abbots Bromley School of Girls, as a Boarding House. The Upper Sixth used the upper floor of the Building, which was refurnished in summer 2010. It was meant to give them a closer feeling of what their lives are going to be like at university.

Closure
In March 2019, the school announced that it would be closing at the end of the 2018–2019 school year. This was due both to falling pupil numbers and longstanding financial problems, requiring the parent Woodard Group to inject £2 million of emergency funding to prevent bankruptcy.

Subsequently, talks were held with investors in Beijing and Hong Kong to see if the school could be sold as a going concern, but no agreement could be reached. As a result, in September 2019 the Woodard group announced the land would be sold by Savills and no further talks would be held on reopening the school.

Statistics
At closure the school had 271 pupils, over 85 of them boarders.

The school was not academically selective but achieved academic results that were generally seen as outstanding for a non-selective school. Its academic, social and sporting provisions were normal for girls' independent schools, but it had two specialities: an equestrian centre and a dance school (Alkins School of Ballet).

The school occupied , split between two sites on either side of the village High Street.

Ethos
Historically, the school was a boarding school, but for some time before closure the majority of pupils had been day pupils. However, the school had restored its boarding ethos to offer a range of boarding alternatives – full, weekly, flexi and occasional boarding. The School took boys and girls from Reception to Year 6 and then girls from Year 7 to 11. The sixth form was co-educational, with a new facility for its International College.

Roch House Preparatory School in 1991 took on extra staff based in an upstairs corridor near Reed Hall with a classroom for UII girls. A couple of years later Roch expanded again to include girls between three and eleven.

Houses
In the 1990s the houses were:
St Mary's side = Roch (red), KSB (bright green), Selwyn (light blue/grey)
St Mary's and St Anne's but next to the road = Coleridge (yellow)
St Anne's = Heywood Rice (light purple/lilac), Meynell Lowe (red/blue stripe), Talbot aka Crofts (Dark green). These were latterly changed to four houses: Saint Anne's (blue), Saint Mary's (red), Saint Chads (Burgundy) and Saint Greg's (grey).

Abbots Bromley Prep School:

Abbots Bromley Senior School:

Commemoration Day: "Jerusalem Heights"
Perhaps one of the most enduring images of the school — and one of its most public manifestations — was its traditional Commemoration Day Procession  every summer term. The pupils processed to the Parish Church of St Nicholas, down the centre of the High Street, in height order wearing white veils ("hoods" unofficially called "tea-towels") fringed with light blue, carrying embroidered banners and singing (unaccompanied) the hymn "Jerusalem my happy home". Members of the school choir wear an additional ankle-length white veil (officially known as "cloaks" and unofficially as "tablecloths"). The service traditionally concludes with the singing of "Forward be our watchword".

Notable former pupils

Vera Chok (living), actress
Margaret Cooper (1922–2013), nurse
Hazel Dolling (1923–2006), châtelaine of Lissan House, Northern Ireland
Annie Kevans (born 1972), artist
Lady Olga Maitland (born 1944), Conservative Member of Parliament
Sue Nicholls (born 1943), actress
Margery Perham (1895–1982), Dame, expert in British colonial history and first woman Reith Lecturer
Philippa Perry (born 1957), psychotherapist and author
Kelly England Prehn (living), international model
Anna Richardson (born 1970), television presenter
Helen Watts (1927–2009), Welsh contralto singer

See also 
Single-sex education
Independent school (United Kingdom)

References

External links 
School Website
Profile on the ISC website
Alkins School of Ballet
Organisation for former pupils: The Guild of S. Mary & S. Anne
Woodard Corporation Website
UK Boarding Schools Guide Profile
School Petition and Parent Action Group

Educational institutions established in 1874
Anglo-Catholic educational establishments
Boarding schools in Staffordshire
Defunct Church of England schools
Girls' schools in Staffordshire
Woodard Schools
Defunct schools in Staffordshire
Educational institutions disestablished in 2019
1874 establishments in England
2019 disestablishments in England